Logic Made Easy: How to Know When Language Deceives You is a 2004 book by Deborah J. Bennett published by W.W. Norton & Company.  Its theme is the analysis of what common words such as "some", "all", and "not" mean, and how logic relates to speech and writing.  It discusses eliminating problems such as ambiguity and imprecise language from communications, such as in technical writing.

References

2004 non-fiction books
Philosophy books
W. W. Norton & Company books